Noyelles-Godault is a commune in the Pas-de-Calais department in the Hauts-de-France region of France.

Geography

Population

Notable people
 Maurice Thorez, politician, was born here in 1900.

Places of interest
 The church of St.Martin, rebuilt along with most of the town, after the First World War.
 One of the most important commercial zone of the region which surrounds the Auchan mall.

See also
Communes of the Pas-de-Calais department

References

External links

 Official town website 
 Website of the agglomération d'Hénin-Carvin 

Noyellesgodault
Artois